Mandanmmar Londanil (English:Stupids in London) is a 1983 Indian Malayalam-language slapstick comedy film, directed by Sathyan Anthikkad and produced by P. H. Rasheed. The film stars Sukumaran, Jalaja, Jagathy Sreekumar, Sankaradi and Nedumudi Venu in the lead roles. The film has musical score by Shyam. The film  regarded as the cult following in malayalam movie .

Plot
Thalayillakkunnu is a rural village in Kerala, India. There is a "Kala Samithi" in this village which performs dramas in temples. When Chandran Menon comes to Thalayillakkunnu from London, he promises them that five people from the village can be taken to London for performing there. Rasheed (Jagathy Sreekumar), Vaasu (Nedumudi Venu), Kunjunni Mashu (Sankaradi), Choyi Moopan (Bahadoor) and Ammini (Jalaja) decide to go. But when they reach London, they see that Chandran has not come to invite them at the Airport. They are left dumbfounded and find ways to survive in the foreign land without knowing English, until they meet Raghu (Sukumaran), who falls in love with Ammini. Trouble begins when the owners of the house force all of them out of the house.

Cast
Jagathy Sreekumar as Rasheed
Nedumudi Venu as Vaasu kumar
Sankaradi as Kunjunni Maashu
Sukumaran as Raghu
Bahadoor as Choyi Moopan
Jalaja as Ammini
Meena Ganesh
Paravoor Bharathan as Kuttappan
Kunchan as Postman Prabhakaran
Philomina as Narayani
Sathaar as Johny

Soundtrack
The music was composed by Shyam and the lyrics were written by Sathyan Anthikkad.

References

External links
 

1983 films
1980s Malayalam-language films